is a railway station located in Kagoshima, Kagoshima, Japan. The station opened in 1988.

Lines 
Kyushu Railway Company
Ibusuki Makurazaki Line

JR

Adjacent stations

Nearby places
Jigenji Post office
Kagoshima City Wada Elementary School

Railway stations in Kagoshima Prefecture
Railway stations in Japan opened in 1988